Zürcher Geschnetzeltes (German for "sliced meat Zürich style", Züri-Gschnätzlets in Zürich German, émincé de veau à la zurichoise in French) is a Swiss dish from Zürich.

The first mention of Zürcher Geschnetzeltes is in a cookbook from 1947.  That recipe describes the ingredients as sliced veal strips, white wine, cream, and demiglace.  Some contemporary recipes may also call for mushrooms and sliced veal kidney.

Method
The veal is cut into small thin strips, sautéed quickly in a very hot pan with a little butter and a bit of chopped onion, then taken out and kept warm. White wine is used to deglaze the pan, then cream and demiglace are added and reduced into a sauce. The meat is returned to the reduction, along with sliced mushrooms. Finally, the dish is seasoned with salt, pepper, and a squeeze of lemon juice.  A dash of paprika is sometimes added as a garnish.

Zürcher Geschnetzeltes is typically served with rösti, the traditional Swiss shredded potato cake.  Alternatives include spätzle, pasta, rice, or mashed potatoes.

See also
 Beef Stroganov
 List of veal dishes

References

External links
 Recipe for Züri-Geschnetzeltes (German)

Swiss cuisine
Veal dishes